David Philip Sturge (born 5 June 1948) is a former British rower who competed for Great Britain in the 1976 Summer Olympics.

Rowing career
Sturge was educated at Cambridge University. He rowed in the winning Cambridge boat in The Boat Race in 1973. Also in 1973, he won the single sculls title rowing for the London Rowing Club, at the 1973 National Rowing Championships., was runner up in the Diamond Challenge Sculls at Henley Royal Regatta, and won the Wingfield Sculls. He won the Wingfield Sculls again in 1974. Sturge competed for Great Britain at the 1976 Summer Olympics in the coxless pairs partnering Henry Clay. They came 12th overall.

See also
List of Cambridge University Boat Race crews

References

1948 births
British male rowers
Cambridge University Boat Club rowers
Olympic rowers of Great Britain
Living people
Rowers at the 1976 Summer Olympics